My Sister and I is a 1948 British drama film directed by Harold Huth and starring Sally Ann Howes, Dermot Walsh and Martita Hunt. The screenplay concerns a woman who comes under suspicion when an elderly lady she lodges with dies and leaves her all her money. It is based on the novel High Pavement by Emery Bonett.

Plot summary
A young woman who acts in a small theatre comes under suspicion of murder when the elderly lady she lodges with dies and leaves her all her money.

Cast
 Sally Ann Howes as Robina Adams
 Dermot Walsh as Graham Forbes
 Martita Hunt as Mrs. Camelot
 Barbara Mullen as Hypatia Foley
 Patrick Holt as Roger Crisp
 Hazel Court as Helena Forsythe
 Joan Rees as Ardath Bondage
 Jane Hylton as Elsie
 Michael Medwin as Charlie
 Rory MacDermot as Michael Marsh
 Hugh Miller as Hubert Bondage
 Ian Wilson as Horsnell
 Niall Lawlor as Harry
 Elizabeth Sydney as Phyllis
 Jack Vyvian as Pomfret
 Helen Goss as Mrs. Pomfret
 Stewart Rome as Colonel Thursby
 Olwen Brookes as Mrs. Lippincott
 Wilfrid Caithness as Coroner
 John Miller as Bishop
 Amy Dalby as Female Cleaner
 James Knight as Dustman
 Barbara Leake as First Elderly Woman
 Diana Dors as Dreary Girl

References

External links

1948 films
1948 drama films
Films directed by Harold Huth
British drama films
British black-and-white films
1940s English-language films
1940s British films